Jeffrey Nimoy is an American voice actor and writer best known as the voice of Nicholas D. Wolfwood from Trigun, and Tentomon (and his higher Digivolution forms) from the Digimon series. Nimoy has reprised his roles of Tentomon and Gennai in the Digimon tri. film series.

Career
Nimoy wrote, directed, and served as story editor for the English adaptation of the Digimon: Digital Monsters anime (1999–2001 series and the franchise films Digimon: The Movie and Digimon 02: Revenge of Diaboromon). He also served as an executive producer and writer on numerous other Fox Kids series. Prior to that, he was nominated for three Emmy Awards in four years, winning once, for his comedic work as a writer and producer for NFL Films Presents on ESPN and Fox. He also co-wrote the Showtime movie Big Brother Trouble (2000), and the animated series Pecola. He is the second cousin once removed of Leonard Nimoy. Nimoy also co-directed the English version of Robodz and the Stitch! anime series.

Nimoy has also starred in the online webisode series Adventures in Anime with Quinton Flynn.

Nimoy also directed and starred in Fame-ish, a movie about a fictional version of himself.

Dubbing roles

Animated series English dubbing

 Cyborg 009 – Additional Voices
 Fushigi Yuugi – Toki Ōsugi

Animated film English dubbing

Video games English dubbing
 Zatch Bell! Mamodo Fury – Kanchome

References

External links
 
 
 
 
 The Jeff Nimoy Experience  at MySpace.
 Adventures in Anime
 Jeff Nimoy: Q and A at The Anime Lodge

Living people
American television directors
Television producers from New York City
American television writers
American male television writers
Place of birth missing (living people)
American male voice actors
American voice directors
Emmy Award winners
New York University alumni
Screenwriters from New York (state)
Year of birth missing (living people)